Bahariye can refer to:

 Bahariye, İnegöl
 Bahariye, Mustafakemalpaşa